Nostradamus Effect is an American sensationalist television series that premiered on September 9, 2009, on the History channel. The program detailed various historical apocalyptic prophecies, such as the 2012 phenomenon. The show was named after reputed French seer Michel de Nostredame, more commonly known as Nostradamus. The series ran for a single season.

It presented itself in a "documentary style" but it was not a documentary. The show's disclaimer stated that it does not take sides regarding the apocalyptic prophecies. In the introduction of each episode, the narrator states, "We will neither refute, nor endorse, these theories; merely, present the evidence." Despite this claim, prophecies are often exaggerated or presented incorrectly.   For example, the show repeatedly claims that the Mayan Long Count calendar predicts the end of the world for December 21, 2012 while in reality it marks the first day of the 14th b'ak'tun era and not any belief in the end of the world.

The series was described as full of misleading suggestions supported by vague, unattributed weasel phrases such as "some think that", "many believe that", and "scholars suggest that", while in his book 2012: It's Not the End of the World Nostradamus specialist Peter Lemesurier describes its Nostradamian aspects as "largely fiction" and "lurid nonsense".

The series was also released on DVD in 2010.

Episodes

References

External links
 
 
 General survey of subject, with links to major sites {Archived}
 The Actual Nostradamus Effect https://storify.com/deltoidmachine/how-we-won-the-james-randi-dollar-1-000-000-parano

History (American TV channel) original programming
Nostradamus
Paranormal television
2009 American television series debuts